O Garimpeiro is a 1920 Brazilian silent drama film directed by and starring Vittorio Capellaro. It is based on the 1870s novel O Garimpeiro by Bernardo Guimarães.

The film premiered on 20 December 1920 in Rio de Janeiro.

External links
 

1920 drama films
1920 films
Brazilian black-and-white films
Brazilian silent films
Brazilian drama films
Silent drama films